The Aris AA Missile system (also known as Aris Anti-Air missile) was a medium-range surface-to-air missile (SAM) originally developed for the Hellenic Army. It was canceled for unknown reasons.

References
https://www.scribd.com/doc/64455999/%CE%97-%CE%BA%CE%B1%CF%84%CE%AC%CF%81%CF%81%CE%B5%CF%85%CF%83%CE%B7-%CF%84%CE%BF%CF%85-%CE%86%CF%81%CF%84%CE%B5%CE%BC%CE%B9%CF%82

External links
 https://web.archive.org/web/20140809205426/http://www.lefed.gr/index.php?option=com_kunena&func=view&catid=2&id=494&Itemid=25

Guided missiles of Greece
Hellenic Army